Olivia Lewis (born 18 October 1978) is a singer from Qormi, Malta.

She has competed in the Malta Song For Eurovision festival, which selects the country's entry for the Eurovision Song Contest several times. At her 11th attempt she finally won the 2007 festival, held on 3 February 2007, with the song "Vertigo" and represented Malta at the semi-final of the Eurovision Song Contest held at the Hartwall Areena in Helsinki, Finland, on 10 May 2007. However, she did not manage to qualify for the final. She placed 25th out of 28 countries with just 15 points. Before she was a professional singer, she was a teacher in Malta.

Malta Song For Eurovision

Olivia was also the winner of Festival Internazzjonali tal-Kanzunetta Maltija 2013 with the song Hawn mill-Ġdid composed by Paul Abela and penned by Joe Julian Farrugia.

References

External links
 Malta Song for Eurovision Official Website
 EscMalta.net
 OGAE MALTA, Malta's official Eurovision Club
 Video of song "Vertigo"

1978 births
Living people
Maltese pop singers
21st-century Maltese women singers
21st-century Maltese singers
Eurovision Song Contest entrants for Malta
Eurovision Song Contest entrants of 2007
People from Qormi
20th-century Maltese women singers
20th-century Maltese singers